Events from the year 1667 in Ireland.

Incumbent
Monarch: Charles II

Events
William Penn attends meetings of the Quakers in Cork, marking his conversion.

Births
 November 30 – Jonathan Swift, cleric, satirist, essayist and poet (d.1745)
 Christian Davies, soldier (d.1739)

Deaths
June 23 – Lady Alice Boyle, later Alice Barry, Countess of Barrymore (b.1607)

References

 
1660s in Ireland
Ireland
Years of the 17th century in Ireland